Alan Kasujja (b. ca. 1978) is a Ugandan journalist and radio broadcaster working for BBC News. Kasujja is one of the main presenters of Newsday on the BBC World Service.

Personal life
Alan Kasujja spent the first twelve years of his life in Kenya, where his family had fled to escape the dictatorship of Idi Amin. He returned to live in Uganda when he was twelve, and later read law at Makerere University.

In December 2003, Kasujja married Sara Shalita, daughter of the late Anglican bishop of Muhabura, Ernest Munyambabazi Shalita. Kasujja is a personal friend to Muhoozi Kainerugaba, and took part in his 48th birthday celebrations.

Career 
Kasujja began his media career in the 1990s, at Sanyu FM. He has worked in both Ugandan TV and radio. He previously hosted the morning radio show 'The Big Breakfast' on Kampala-based on 91.3 Capital FM with Jackie Lumbasi and Ramesh Gabalsing, and has presented the Ugandan version of the game show Who Wants to Be a Millionaire? since 2011. He also hosted The Fourth Estate, a highly influential political talk show in Uganda.

Kasujja has been based in London since 2012, where he is one of the regular presenters on Newsday.

On 15 January 2016, Kasujja co-moderated Uganda's first-ever televised presidential debate, alongside KTN journalist Nancy Kacungira.

External links

References

BBC newsreaders and journalists
BBC World Service presenters
Living people
Ugandan journalists
British male journalists
Makerere University alumni
1978 births
Place of birth missing (living people)
Ugandan radio presenters
Ugandan radio journalists
Ugandan television journalists